Notocrypta is a genus of skipper butterflies. It is one of several closely related genera commonly called "demons". The genus is found in the Australasian and Indomalayan realms.

Notable species
 Restricted demon, Notocrypta curvifascia
 Spotted demon, Notocrypta feisthamelii
 Common banded demon, Notocrypta paralysos
 Notocrypta waigensis

References
Funet
Brower, Andrew V. Z. 2008. Notocrypta de Nicéville 1889. Plesioneura C. Felder & R. Felder 1862 invalid junior homonym of Plesioneura Macquart, 1855. Version 9 June 2008 (under construction).  Notocrypta de Nicéville 1889  in Tree of Life Web Project

 
Hesperiidae genera
Taxa named by Lionel de Nicéville